Mobilian may refer to:

 Mobilian jargon – An informal Native Americans trade language used among the tribes of the Southeastern United States, primarily along the coast of the Gulf of Mexico
 The Native American village of Mabila
 A resident of the city of Mobile, Alabama